Charles Lively (1893 – January 1971) was a British athlete. He competed in the men's long jump  and the men's triple jump at the 1920 Summer Olympics.

References

External links
 

1893 births
1971 deaths
Athletes (track and field) at the 1920 Summer Olympics
British male long jumpers
British male triple jumpers
Olympic athletes of Great Britain
Place of birth missing